Charles Edward Perry (1937–1999), was the founding president of Florida International University in Miami, appointed in 1965. Perry died on August 30, 1999, at his home in Rockwall, Texas. He is buried on the campus of FIU at the southeast corner of the Charles E. Perry building. The Charles E. Perry building located on the FIU campus is named in his honor. Chuck Perry graduated from Bowling Green State University in 1959, where he was a member of Sigma Nu and played as a place kicker on Doyt Perry's football teams. He stayed on in fund raising for the university and has a building named for him at Bowling Green. Later, he managed Jack Nicklaus's investments. Prior to being appointed to Florida International, he ran The Weekly Reader which was distributed to many secondary schools.

External links
The Beacon Online
FIU Golden Panthers License Plates
Charles E. Perry Papers and Ephemera at Florida International University

1937 births
1999 deaths
Presidents of Florida International University
People from Rockwall, Texas
20th-century American academics